Comparable may refer to:

 Comparability, in mathematics
 Comparative, in grammar, a word that denotes the degree by which an entity has a property greater or less in extent than another

See also 
 Incomparable (disambiguation)